The 1929 Ole Miss Rebels football team represented the University of Mississippi during the 1929 Southern Conference football season. The season's only victory was over Loyola.

Schedule

References

Ole Miss
Ole Miss Rebels football seasons
Ole Miss Rebels football